Priya Narasimhan is a Professor of Electrical & Computer Engineering at Carnegie Mellon University in Pittsburgh, Pennsylvania. She is also the CEO and founder of YinzCam, a U.S.-based technology company that provides the mobile fan experience for a number of professional sports teams and leagues in the United States, Canada, Australia and New Zealand.

Biography 
Narasimhan was born in India and lived in Zambia, in Africa. She attended the University of California, Santa Barbara, where she completed her Ph.D. in Electrical and Computer Engineering and received the 2000 Lancaster Best Doctoral Dissertation Award for her research in the area of developing mechanisms to provide fault-tolerance transparently (i.e., with no code modifications) to existing distributed applications. In 2001, she moved to Pittsburgh to join Carnegie Mellon University as a faculty member, where her academic interests include dependable distributed systems, fault-tolerance, embedded systems, mobile systems and sports technology. Her spare time is devoted to watching professional(American) football and ice-hockey games. She became a fan of the Pittsburgh Penguins upon moving to Pittsburgh in 2001. She is also a fan of the Pittsburgh Steelers.

Awards 
 Lancaster Best Doctoral Dissertation Award, 2000
 National Science Foundation's CAREER Award, 2003
 Alfred Sloan Fellowship, 2007
 Student-voted Eta Kappa Nu Excellence in Teaching Award, 2008
 Carnegie Science Emerging Female Scientist Award, 2009
 Carnegie Mellon Benjamin Teare Teaching Award, 2009
 Lutron Electronics Spira Teaching Award
 ad:tech Innovation Award, 2011
 New Company Executive International Bridge Award, Global Pittsburgh
 Innovator of the Year in Consumer Products, Pittsburgh Tech Council, 2016
 2016 Gamechanger, Sports Business Journal
 Heinz History Center's History Maker in Innovation, 2017.

Research and Entrepreneurship 
Her Ph.D. research was commercialized through Eternal Systems, Inc., a company where she served as Chief Technology Officer and the Vice-President of Engineering to transform her Ph.D. research into products for commercial use. Her research led to the development of 24x7 highly available platforms and solutions for data centers, large online systems and deeply embedded systems.

She has been a faculty member in the Electrical and Computer Engineering Department at Carnegie Mellon University since 2001. She has served as co-director of the CyLab Mobility Research Center at Carnegie Mellon University and headed the Intel Science and Technology Centre in Embedded Computing at Carnegie Mellon University. She has written and published more than 150 research papers on distributed systems and fault tolerance, research that led to the development of the Fault Tolerant CORBA industrial standard. With her Ph.D. students at Carnegie Mellon, she has worked on research in the areas of failure diagnosis, mobile edge computing, adaptive fault-tolerance, live software upgrades, static analysis, and machine-learning to solve systems problems.

Her interest in computers and technology for sports led her to develop mobile apps bringing real-time statistics, multimedia, streaming radio, social media, and live video feeds to teams in the NFL, NBA, NHL, NRL, AFL, NBL, CFL and other sports leagues around the world. She has also worked to launch a new data platform to help sports teams understand their business operations and to improve the fan experience. She brings the lessons from her industry experience with YinzCam into her Internet of Sports Things course at Carnegie Mellon University, as well as to motivate Ph.D. research in the field of mobile edge-computing and using edge clouds to improve the user experience in high-density environments such as stadiums. She has also worked to incorporate embedded systems into sports through her Football Engineering project that aimed to track the real-time trajectory of footballs, players and other equipment on the field at game-time. Through the Trinetra project, she developed mobile technologies to provide increased independence to blind people in their daily activities such as shopping, taking public transportation. Through YinzCam, she collaborated with the Pittsburgh City Council to develop and launch iBurgh, a groundbreaking mobile app to allow citizens to report complaints to the city's IT departments via smartphones.

She had also developed AndyVision, a robot project funded by the Intel Science and Technology Center at Carnegie Mellon University that is capable of quickly inventorying merchandise and detecting out-of-stock conditions in retail environments.

References 

Indian emigrants to the United States
Businesspeople from Pittsburgh
Carnegie Mellon University faculty
University of California, Santa Barbara alumni
Living people
American technology chief executives
Women chief technology officers
American women chief executives
American people of Indian descent
Year of birth missing (living people)